South Branch Towanda Creek is a tributary of Towanda Creek in Bradford County, Pennsylvania, in the United States.

Course
South Branch Towanda Creek begins on a hill in Terry Township. It flows southwest for a short distance and then turns southwest and flows through several small lakes. The creek enters Albany Township and after some distance begins to gradually turn north-northwest, flowing parallel to U.S. Route 220. After several miles, it passes through New Albany, where it receives the tributaries Beaver Run and Ladds Creek. Continuing roughly north, the creek passes by Hatch Mountain and enters Monroe Township. In Monroe Township, it receives the tributaries Fenner Run, Saterlee Run, and Kent Run. It passes Nichols Point, Marcy Point, and Kellogg Mountain. A few miles downstream, the creek reaches its confluence with Towanda Creek near the community of Monroeton.

Geography
South Branch Towanda Creek drops fairly steeply along its length, but is fairly shallow and has numerous rock outcroppings on it. The creek flows through a canyon-like valley and has a riparian buffer in many places. There are some strainers along it.

Watershed
The creek lacks a gauge.

Recreation
The creek's difficulty rating ranges between 1 and 3 and it is considered to be suitable for intermediate canoers. Edward Gertler describes the scenery along the creek as "fair to good" in his book Keystone Canoeing.

See also
List of rivers of Pennsylvania
Schrader Creek

References

Rivers of Pennsylvania
Tributaries of the Susquehanna River
Rivers of Bradford County, Pennsylvania